The Birchfield Ladbroke Stadium, also known as the old Perry Barr Greyhound Stadium or Alexander Sports Stadium was a former greyhound racing and Motorcycle speedway stadium in Birchfield in the north of Birmingham, England.

It is not to be confused with the current Perry Barr Stadium on the other side of the Walsall Road and accessed from Aldridge Road.

Speedway

Origins 
The third greyhound track to open in Birmingham was Perry Barr in the Birchfield area of North Birmingham. Kings Heath Stadium and Hall Green Stadium had both opened in 1927 to large audiences and Perry Barr soon followed in the spring of 1928. The track was situated west of the Walsall Road on the opposite side of the road from the Alexander Sports Ground and accessed on Regina Drive. The River Tame ran below the stadium next to the railway tracks before being diverted in the 1990s.

Opening
The opening night was on 7 April 1928 and was promoted by the Birmingham Greyhound Club Limited. The stadium had been built to the cost of £70,000. Despite the fact that the sport was experiencing a boom for some reason the promoters ran into financial difficulties and within two years were left bankrupt. The Birmingham Greyhound Club Limited had failed to capitalise on the growing interest observed all around the country. A licence to continue racing was refused in November 1928 due to evidence of funds owed and the official receiver announced that £95,000 was owed to creditors during a meeting in August 1929 (an extraordinary amount based on the fact that the stadium had only cost £75,000 to build).

Pre-War History

Perry Barr Stadium Ltd became the new promoters of greyhound racing and the circuit was described as a good galloping track with long straights and banked bends suiting all types of dogs, especially large, wide and 'leggy-on-the-turn' varieties. The circumference
was 462 yards with distances of 500, 525 & 700 yards behind an M&S cable outside hare. The Racing Manager was Mr J.Poole.

Next to the car park was the 3’6 enclosure and the main stand with dining facilities, a milk bar and tote booths. On the opposite side of the track was the 2’6 enclosure, another milk bar and the club stand. On the first bend was the race kennels and paddock featuring four ranges of kennels for forty dogs each, three of these were for home trained dogs with the fourth being for newcomers and visitors. There was also an isolation block for sick and injured dogs with a separate surgery.

Mick the Miller attracted thousands in 1931 when he took on two hounds in match races. He beat St Leger champion Maidens Boy on 8 August but lost to Northern Flat champion Ross Regatta on 19 September. A disastrous fire in April 1937 failed to halt progress at this Midlands track, the fire caused £12,000 worth of damage, a very significant figure in 1937. The Birmingham Cup was introduced in 1939 as the premier event to be held annually and it was quickly established as a notable competition.

During the war years the Mr Bithel owned, Tom Baldwin trained Model Dasher won the Midland Puppy Derby and Eclipse. The white and brindle dog then broke two track records before winning the Key, the Test, Wembley Gold Cup and Birmingham Cup in 1944.

Post-War History 
In 1947 Slaney Record trained by Jack Toseland finished third in the English Greyhound Derby and the following year Baytown Stork qualified for the Derby final, it was a great feat for a trainer outside of London to make two consecutive finals. Toseland was to train four more Derby finalists (three in the next four years), Saft Alex in 1949, Black Mire the runner up in 1951, Dashboard Dan in 1952 and Shy Prairie some years later in 1965 completing a remarkable sequence of achievements.

In 1970 another fire caused extensive damage but the main stand was rebuilt with a new restaurant and bar facilities and the track reopened soon after. Frank Baldwin had taken over kennels owned by his father Tom (who would retire to Wales) and along with fellow trainers John Bassett, Bertie Gaynor, Paddy McEvoy and Barbara Tompkins they made the track the strongest provincial track in the country. John Rowe a former trainer at Knowle Stadium and Oxford Stadium and Racing Manager at Leicester Stadium switched to the take over at Perry Barr. John’s son Bob was Racing Manager at rival track Hall Green Stadium.

On 23 April 1974 win number twelve came the way of Westpark Mustard over 550 yards at the track, when she was challenging the world record. In 1976 the stadium was bought by Ladbrokes and renamed the Birchfield Ladbroke Stadium, the purchase had arisen after Ladbrokes missed out on securing a takeover of Romford Greyhound Stadium and Brighton & Hove Greyhound Stadium, beaten to it by Coral. As a result, they turned their attention to the Midlands and bought Perry Barr and the Totalisators and Greyhound Holdings, which owned six stadia at Brough Park, Crayford & Bexleyheath, Leeds, Gosforth, Willenhall and Monmore.

Further investment followed with facilities being updated by the bookmaking giant, £100,000 was spent including new lighting. In 1981 they hosted the trainer's championship. Jim Woods, formerly Charlie Boulton’s assistant at Harringay Stadium took up the position of Racing Manager in 1982. The racing pattern was Tuesdays, Thursday and Saturdays.

Closure 
In the 1980s rumours surfaced regarding the desire of Ladbrokes to sell the land to developers, unsettled trainers Paddy Hancox and Bertie Gaynor moved to Hall Green and Coventry respectively which became a huge problem for the track. The rumours proved to be true when a sale to developers was agreed and the site sold, the last meeting was held on 14 April 1984, 56 years after it had opened.
The site today is the huge 'One Stop' shopping centre and not a single sign of the old track exists but greyhound racing did resume in 1990 at the nearby Perry Barr Stadium.

Competitions
 Birmingham Cup

Track records

+ Record holder during year

References

Defunct sports venues in the West Midlands (county)
Defunct greyhound racing venues in the United Kingdom
Perry Barr
History of Birmingham, West Midlands
Defunct speedway venues in England